Subsidence is a general term for downward vertical movement of the Earth's surface, which can be caused by both natural processes and human activities. Subsidence involves little or no horizontal movement, which distinguishes it from slope movement.

Processes that lead to subsidence include dissolution of underlying carbonate rock by groundwater; gradual compaction of sediments; withdrawal of fluid lava from beneath a solidified crust of rock; mining; pumping of subsurface fluids, such as groundwater or petroleum; or warping of the Earth's crust by tectonic forces. Subsidence resulting from tectonic deformation of the crust is known as tectonic subsidence and can create accommodation for sediments to accumulate and eventually lithify into sedimentary rock.

Ground subsidence is of global concern to geologists, geotechnical engineers, surveyors, engineers, urban planners, landowners, and the public in general.

Causes

Dissolution of limestone
Subsidence frequently causes major problems in karst terrains, where dissolution of limestone by fluid flow in the subsurface creates voids (i.e., caves). If the roof of a void becomes too weak, it can collapse and the overlying rock and earth will fall into the space, causing subsidence at the surface. This type of subsidence can cause sinkholes which can be many hundreds of meters deep.

Mining
Several types of sub-surface mining, and specifically methods which intentionally cause the extracted void to collapse (such as pillar extraction, longwall mining and any metalliferous mining method which uses "caving" such as "block caving" or "sub-level caving") will result in surface subsidence.  Mining-induced subsidence is relatively predictable in its magnitude, manifestation and extent, except where a sudden pillar or near-surface tunnel collapse occurs (usually very old workings). Mining-induced subsidence is nearly always very localized to the surface above the mined area, plus a margin around the outside. The vertical magnitude of the subsidence itself typically does not cause problems, except in the case of drainage (including natural drainage)–rather, it is the associated surface compressive and tensile strains, curvature, tilts and horizontal displacement that are the cause of the worst damage to the natural environment, buildings and infrastructure.

Where mining activity is planned, mining-induced subsidence can be successfully managed if there is co-operation from all of the stakeholders. This is accomplished through a combination of careful mine planning, the taking of preventive measures, and the carrying out of repairs post-mining.

Extraction of petroleum and natural gas
If natural gas is extracted from a natural gas field the initial pressure (up to 60 MPa (600 bar)) in the field will drop over the years. The pressure helps support the soil layers above the field. If the gas is extracted, the overburden pressure sediment compacts and may lead to earthquakes and subsidence at the ground level.

Since exploitation of the Slochteren (Netherlands) gas field started in the late 1960s the ground level over a 250 km2 area has dropped by a current maximum of 30 cm.

Extraction of petroleum likewise can cause significant subsidence. The city of Long Beach, California, has experienced  over the course of 34 years of petroleum extraction, resulting in damage of over $100 million to infrastructure in the area. The subsidence was brought to a halt when secondary recovery wells pumped enough water into the oil reservoir to stabilize it.

Earthquake 
Land subsidence can occur in various ways during an earthquake. Large areas of land can subside drastically during an earthquake because of offset along fault lines. Land subsidence can also occur as a result of settling and compacting of unconsolidated sediment from the shaking of an earthquake.

The Geospatial Information Authority of Japan reported immediate subsidence caused by the 2011 Tōhoku earthquake. In Northern Japan, subsidence of 0.50 m (1.64 ft) was observed on the coast of the Pacific Ocean in Miyako, Tōhoku, while Rikuzentakata, Iwate measured 0.84 m (2.75 ft). In the south at Sōma, Fukushima, 0.29 m (0.95 ft) was observed. The maximum amount of subsidence was 1.2 m (3.93 ft), coupled with horizontal diastrophism of up to 5.3 m (17.3 ft) on the Oshika Peninsula in Miyagi Prefecture.

Groundwater-related subsidence

Groundwater-related subsidence is the subsidence (or the sinking) of land resulting from groundwater extraction. It is a growing problem in the developing world as cities increase in population and water use, without adequate pumping regulation and enforcement. One estimate has 80% of serious land subsidence problems associated with the excessive extraction of groundwater, making it a growing problem throughout the world.

Groundwater fluctuations can also indirectly affect the decay of organic material. The habitation of lowlands, such as coastal or delta plains, requires drainage. The resulting aeration of the soil leads to the oxidation of its organic components, such as peat, and this decomposition process may cause significant land subsidence. This applies especially when groundwater levels are periodically adapted to subsidence, in order to maintain desired unsaturated zone depths, exposing more and more peat to oxygen. In addition to this, drained soils consolidate as a result of increased effective stress. In this way, land subsidence has the potential of becoming self-perpetuating, having rates up to 5 cm/yr. Water management used to be tuned primarily to factors such as crop optimization but, to varying extents, avoiding subsidence has come to be taken into account as well.

Faulting induced
When differential stresses exist in the Earth, these can be accommodated either by geological faulting in the brittle crust, or by ductile flow in the hotter and more fluid mantle.  Where faults occur, absolute subsidence may occur in the hanging wall of normal faults.  In reverse, or thrust, faults, relative subsidence may be measured in the footwall.

Isostatic subsidence
The crust floats buoyantly in the asthenosphere, with a ratio of mass below the "surface" in proportion to its own density and the density of the asthenosphere. If mass is added to a local area of the crust (e.g., through deposition), the crust subsides to compensate and maintain isostatic balance.

The opposite of isostatic subsidence is known as isostatic rebound—the action of the crust returning (sometimes over periods of thousands of years) to a state of isostacy, such as after the melting of large ice sheets or the drying-up of large lakes after the last ice age. Lake Bonneville is a famous example of isostatic rebound. When the lake dried up, the crust rebounded. Today at Lake Bonneville, the center of the former lake is about  higher than the former lake edges.

Seasonal effects

Many soils contain significant proportions of clay. Because of the very small particle size, they are affected by changes in soil moisture content. Seasonal drying of the soil results in a lowering of both the volume and the surface of the soil. If building foundations are above the level reached by seasonal drying, they move, possibly resulting in damage to the building in the form of tapering cracks.

Trees and other vegetation can have a significant local effect on seasonal drying of soils. Over a number of years, a cumulative drying occurs as the tree grows. That can lead to the opposite of subsidence, known as heave or swelling of the soil, when the tree declines or is felled. As the cumulative moisture deficit is reversed, which can last up to 25 years, the surface level around the tree will rise and expand laterally. That often damages buildings unless the foundations have been strengthened or designed to cope with the effect.

Impacts

Sinking cities

See also
Cave-in
Lateral and subjacent support, a related concept in property law
Mass wasting
Settlement (structural)
Sinkhole
Soil liquefaction
UNESCO Working Group on Land Subsidence

References

Depressions (geology)
Soil mechanics
Building defects
Geomorphology
Vertical position